MV Polar Princess was a Norwegian seismic survey vessel owned by Rieber Shipping AS, and is operated by them on behalf of CGGVeritas. The ship was <ref=https://www.marinetraffic.com/en/ais/details/ships/shipid:180637/mmsi:-8501074/imo:8501074/vessel:MGS_SAGAR>decommissioned</ref> in early 2020. The ship was formerly operated by Geophysical Service Incorporated along with the now decommissioned MV Polar Prince survey ship.

External links
PDF data sheet concerning the MV Polar Princess

Research vessels of Norway
Survey ships
1985 ships
Ships built in Norway
Merchant ships of Norway